Luksong tinik (English: "jumping over thorns") is a popular game in the Philippines. It is originated in Cabanatuan, Nueva Ecija, played by two teams with equal numbers of players. Each team designates a leader, the nanay (mother), while the rest of the players are called anak (children). The players chosen to be nanay are usually the ones who can jump the highest. The game involves players sitting on the ground and other players jumping over parts of their body.

Basically you just jump over people's feet which is meant to be the tinik which one foot/hand of the 2 players sitting on the ground will be added after all players have jumped the 1st round

In Myanmar, a similar game is known as Hpan Khone and is played mostly by girls.

References

Burmese culture
Philippine games